Miklós Mohay (born 28 December 1960 in Budapest) is a Hungarian composer and professor. He currently serves as head of the music theory department at the Lizst Academy in Budapest, Hungary. He won the Ferenc Erkel Prize in 2007.

Works, editions and recordings
 Hosszú út porábából
 Choral works - Miklós Kocsár, Miklós Mohay, Erzsébet Szőnyi, Levente Gyöngyösi, Zoltán Gárdonyi. HCD32190 Hungaroton

References

Hungarian composers
Hungarian male composers
1960 births
Musicians from Budapest
Living people
20th-century Hungarian male musicians